Love Tattoo is the second studio album by the Irish rockabilly musician Imelda May, released on 20 October 2008 on Universal Music.

Track listing

Personnel
All personnel credits adapted from Love Tattoos liner notes.

Performers
Imelda May – vocals, bodhrán, producer
Darrel Higham – guitar
Al Gare – bass, double bass
Danny McCormack – piano, organ
Dave Priseman – trumpet, flugelhorn, percussion
Dean Beresford – drums

Design personnel
Jules Vegas – photography

Charts

Weekly charts

Year-end charts

All-time charts

Certifications

References

2008 albums
Imelda May albums
Rockabilly albums